Katarzyna "Kasia" Niewiadoma (born 29 September 1994) is a Polish racing cyclist, who rides for UCI Women's WorldTeam . Among her wins are the Amstel Gold Race, the Trofeo Alfredo Binda and the stage race The Women's Tour. She is a former national champion in both the road race and time trial events. 

In July 2022, she was named as one of the pre-race favourites for the first edition of the Tour de France Femmes, and eventually finished third overall.

Early years
Niewiadoma started racing bikes with local club WLKS Krakus BBC Czaja and soon emerged as one of the most promising women riders in Poland. In 2013, she won two national Under-23 champion titles, finishing 4th in both the elite time-trial and elite road race. She also finished 5th in European Road Championships in the women's Under-23 road race.

Following these performances, she received an offer from professional team  and became a stagiaire in August 2013. She participated in the Boels Ladies Tour, finishing 10th overall and winning the young rider classification. Niewiadoma was also selected for the UCI Road World Championships but she did not finish the elite women's race.

Professional career

2014
She took her first victory four months later, winning the Swiss race GP Gippingen. Preparing for Giro d'Italia Femminile, Niewiadoma participated in the Polish National Championships, taking bronze in the elite women's time trial and finishing 8th in the road race. Her climbing abilities proved to be an asset for the  team, as she worked for the final victory of Marianne Vos on the mountain stages in Italian Alps. She finished 11th overall and 3rd in the young riders classification, marking a successful debut in the biggest race of the elite women's calendar in her first year as a professional.

Niewiadoma then went on to take her first podium spot in a stage race. Together with Anna van der Breggen and Vos she dominated racing during the 1st edition of Ladies Tour of Norway and placed 3rd, winning the best young rider classification and the best climber standings. In September, she signed a two-year contract extension with the  team and concluded preparations for the World Championships with a start in the Premondiale Giro della Toscana, placing 8th overall. On a hilly route in Ponferrada she led the Polish team in the women's elite road race, coming to the finish in 11th place after a sprint from the selected group.

2015

In her second year as a professional Niewiadoma shone as one of the best young riders in the peloton, giving Poland results it had never had in women's cycling. She once again demonstrated her climbing abilities with 6th place in the inaugural edition of Strade Bianche Donne and 5th in the prestigious World Cup race La Flèche Wallonne Féminine. She also took a podium spot in the Dutch race Boels Rental Hills Classic, finishing behind Lizzie Armitstead and Emma Johansson. In June she won Emakumeen Euskal Bira, a five-day stage race in the Basque Country, and won silver in the elite women's road race at the European Games.

Despite being only 21, Niewiadoma started the season's biggest race – the Giro Rosa – as one of 's leaders. She quickly assumed the lead of the young rider classification and held on to the top places on the mountain stages. She then clocked the fifth-fastest time on the demanding route of stage 8, a  time trial, and climbed up to 4th overall with just one mountaintop finish to go. The long climb to San Domenico di Varzo proved decisive and Niewiadoma crossed the line in 7th, finishing 5th overall, winning the white jersey for best young rider and celebrating Anna van der Breggen's overall success. With those results under her belt Niewiadoma led the Polish national team at the European Road Championships in Tartu and took gold in the women's under-23 road race, bridging to the leading group on the last lap and claiming the sprint ahead of Italy's Ilaria Sanguineti and fellow  rider Thalita de Jong. She concluded the season at the World Championships in Richmond, being a part of a  squad that secured bronze in the team time trial event. She also led the Polish team in the elite women's road race and sprinted to 7th place.

Major results

2011
 Klomnice
1st Road race
9th Time trial
 UEC European Junior Road Championships
8th Road race
10th Time trial
2012
 2nd Time trial, National Junior Road Championships
 Klomnice
7th Time trial
8th Road race
2013
 1st  National Hill Climb Championships
 2nd Overall Langenloiser Radrenntage (ARBO Cup)
 Klomnice
3rd Road race
3rd Time trial
 National Road Championships
4th Road race
4th Time trial
 4th Overall Górski Walbrzyski Wyscig Kolarski
 4th Cup of Poland – Postomino (ITT)
 5th Road race, UEC European Under-23 Road Championships
 7th Overall Tour de Feminin – O cenu Ceského Švýcarska
 10th Overall Holland Ladies Tour
1st  Young rider classification
2014
 1st GP du Canton d'Argovie
 1st Frauen Prolog Grand Prix Gippingen
 National Road Championships
3rd Time trial
8th Road race
 3rd Overall Tour of Norway
1st  Mountains classification
1st  Young rider classification
 8th Overall Giro della Toscana
 8th Overall Holland Ladies Tour
 9th Omloop van het Hageland
2015
 UEC European Under-23 Road Championships
1st  Road race
5th Time trial
 1st  Overall Emakumeen Euskal Bira
1st  Mountains classification
 2nd  Road race, European Games
 National Road Championships
2nd Time trial
4th Road race
 2nd Durango-Durango Emakumeen Saria
 UCI Road World Championships
3rd  Team time trial
7th Road race
 3rd Holland Hills Classic
 5th Overall Giro d'Italia Femminile
1st  Young rider classification
 5th Overall Belgium Tour
 5th La Flèche Wallonne
 6th Strade Bianche
2016
 UEC European Road Championships
1st  Under-23 road race
2nd  Road race
 National Road Championships
1st  Road race
1st  Time trial
 1st  Young rider classification, UCI Women's World Tour
 1st  Overall Festival Luxembourgeois du cyclisme féminin Elsy Jacobs
1st  Young rider classification
1st Stage 2
 1st  Overall Giro del Trentino Alto Adige-Südtirol
1st Mountains classification
1st Young rider classification
1st Stages 1 & 2a (TTT)
 1st Ronde van Gelderland
 2nd Strade Bianche
 4th GP de Plouay
 4th La Flèche Wallonne
 5th Overall Holland Ladies Tour
1st  Points classification
1st  Young rider classification
1st Stages 3 & 6
 6th Road race, Olympic Games
 7th Overall Giro d'Italia Femminile
1st  Young rider classification
 7th Trofeo Alfredo Binda
 8th Giro dell'Emilia
 10th Tour of Flanders
2017
 1st  Overall The Women's Tour
1st Stage 1
 2nd Strade Bianche
 3rd Amstel Gold Race
 3rd La Flèche Wallonne
 3rd Liège–Bastogne–Liège
 5th Road race, UCI Road World Championships
 6th Overall Giro d'Italia Femminile
 7th Overall Holland Ladies Tour
 8th Tour of Flanders
 8th Trofeo Alfredo Binda
 9th Dwars door Vlaanderen
 9th La Course by Le Tour de France
2018
 1st  Overall Tour Cycliste Féminin International de l'Ardèche
1st  Mountains classification
1st  Combination classification
1st Stage 5
 1st Trofeo Alfredo Binda
 2nd Strade Bianche
 3rd Overall Tour of California
 5th Overall Tour of Norway
1st  Mountains classification
 6th La Course by Le Tour de France
 7th Overall Setmana Ciclista Valenciana
 7th Overall Giro Rosa
 8th Dwars door Vlaanderen
 9th Tour of Flanders
 10th GP de Plouay
2019
 1st Amstel Gold Race
 2nd Overall The Women's Tour
1st  Mountains classification
1st Stage 4
 3rd Strade Bianche
 4th Overall Tour of Norway
 5th Overall Tour of California
 5th Overall Giro Rosa
1st Stage 1 (TTT)
 6th Trofeo Alfredo Binda
 6th Tour of Flanders
 6th La Flèche Wallonne
 6th Liège–Bastogne–Liège
 10th Dwars door Vlaanderen
2020
 2nd Overall Giro Rosa
 3rd  Road race, UEC European Road Championships
 4th La Course by Le Tour de France
 7th Road race, UCI Road World Championships
 10th La Flèche Wallonne
2021
 2nd La Flèche Wallonne
 2nd Dwars door Vlaanderen
 3rd  Road race, UCI Road World Championships
 4th Road race, UEC European Road Championships
 4th Trofeo Alfredo Binda
 4th Liège–Bastogne–Liège
 4th Durango-Durango Emakumeen Saria
 6th Overall Challenge by La Vuelta
 6th La Course by Le Tour de France
 8th Overall BeNe Ladies Tour
 9th Strade Bianche
 10th Overall Vuelta a Burgos
 10th Amstel Gold Race
2022
 2nd Brabantse Pijl
 3rd Overall Tour de France
 3rd Overall The Women's Tour
 4th Strade Bianche
 5th Amstel Gold Race
 6th Overall Setmana Ciclista Valenciana
 8th Road race, UCI Road World Championships
 8th Tour of Flanders
 9th Liège–Bastogne–Liège
 10th Challenge by La Vuelta
2023
 6th Strade Bianche

General classification results timeline

Classics results timeline

References

External links
 
 
 
 
 
 
 
 

1994 births
Living people
Polish female cyclists
European Games medalists in cycling
European Games silver medalists for Poland
Cyclists at the 2015 European Games
Olympic cyclists of Poland
Cyclists at the 2016 Summer Olympics
Cyclists at the 2020 Summer Olympics
People from Limanowa
Sportspeople from Lesser Poland Voivodeship